A Schwartzkopff-Eckhardt II bogie (Schwartzkopff-Eckhardt-II-Lenkgestell or Schwartzkopff-Eckhardt-Gestell) is a mechanical device to improve the curve running of steam locomotives.

The Schwartzkopff-Eckhardt II bogie is a further refinement of the Krauss-Helmholtz bogie, whereby two coupled axles and the carrying axle are combined within the bogie. The carrying axle steers the second coupled axle via a long shaft and this also moves the first coupled axle via a Beugniot lever. This bogie is used on the DRG Class 84. Whether DR Class 99.23-24 locomotives were also fitted with this arrangement is not entirely clear.

It was named after the L. Schwartzkopff locomotive factory and its chief engineer, Friedrich Wilhelm Eckhardt.

See also
DRG Class 84 
DR Class 99.23-24

References 
Friedrich Wilhelm Eckhardt: Das Fahrgestell der Dampflokomotiven, Transpress, Berlin 1960
Friedrich Wilhelm Eckhardt: Lokomotivkunde. H. 5. Das Fahrgestell der Dampflokomotiven, Fachbuchverlag Leipzig, 1957

External links
 

Steam locomotive technologies
Bogie